In the fictional universe of Warhammer 40,000, the Tyranids are a race and a playable army in the tabletop miniatures wargame.

The Tyranids are described as a nomadic society of aliens which originated from beyond the Milky Way Galaxy and arrived on its periphery with the intent of consuming all life and biomass within. All individual Tyranid creatures are mildly telepathic and form a highly intelligent Hive Mind. There are numerous Tyranid forms, each one bio-engineered by the Hive Mind to serve a specific purpose. Tyranid technology is biological in nature, made up of living components termed biomorphs which fulfill similar roles to the technologies used by other races in Warhammer 40,000.

Development 
The visual design of the Tyranids was inspired by the art of H. R. Giger, with the genestealer sub-race being further inspired by the Xenomorphs from the Alien franchise.

Tyranids were first described in Warhammer 40,000: Rogue Trader, the first edition of the miniature wargame Warhammer 40,000. At that time they were not an emphasised race in the game, instead representing a limited number of occasionally encountered alien antagonists. Their physical appearance was not especially imposing: they were depicted as six limbed, relatively diminutive creatures (an appearance which would later be assigned to Tyranid Termagants). In later iterations of Warhammer 40,000-related products (starting with the release of Advanced Space Crusade) the Tyranids were given a complete makeover and became a major race, popularised by a number of successful expansions.

In the tabletop games

Warhammer 40,000
Tyranid infantry units tend to be fast, hard-hitting, but frail. They also have low point values, meaning Tyranid armies in play tend to be large. Tyranids have the most powerful counter-measures against enemies with psychic powers: many Tyranid units possess the "Shadow in the Warp" trait, which makes it harder for nearby enemy psykers to use their powers.

Genestealers are a sub-species of the Tyranid race, and while they can be played as part of a Tyranid army, they can also be played as a separate army in their own right. This genestealer army has human-genestealer hybrids, who to varying degrees resemble humans. Some hybrids look perfectly human, and therefore a player can integrate Imperial Guard units into a genestealer army, passing them off as human-genestealer hybrids.

Space Hulk

Space Hulk is a spin-off of Warhammer 40,000, which takes place in the corridors of a derelict spaceship. This game features Tyranid genestealers as the enemies.

History

Games Workshop has introduced three main hive fleets; Behemoth and Kraken, which have been both defeated, and Leviathan, which is one of the current threats to the known galaxy. The 8th edition Codex has also introduced a number of smaller hive fleets and splinter fleets, such as Hydra and Gorgon, among a number of others, such as Hive Fleets Jormungandr, Colossus, Tiamet,  Ouroboros, Dagon, and Kronos. There are many other Tyranid hive fleets that have been destroyed or are still emerging. It is noted that these names are given by the scholars of the Imperium, rather than the Tyranids themselves. In fact, there is no evidence in the fiction that Tyranids have language or civilization, at least not as understood by other species native to the Milky Way. In many stories, they communicate with a complex array of insectoid clicking and buzzing noises, as well as reptilian roars, growls, and hissing sounds. Tyranids are thought to communicate primarily via a strong synaptic link to the so-called Hive Mind.

Tyranids were first mentioned in the 1987 rulebook Warhammer 40,000: Rogue Trader under the heading Tyranids and the Hive Fleets, and were illustrated in a form not too different from that of Gaunts.

The first Tyranids used conventional, non-biological equipment such as lasguns and flak armor (although the rulebook stated that these represented organic equipment with similar capabilities). The principal unit available to the Tyranids was the Zoat, a centaur-like creature enslaved to fight on the behalf of their Tyranid masters. In 2020 Zoats were made a part of the setting again, in the Blackstone Fortress campaign.

Genestealers were first introduced in the board game Space Hulk published in 1989, being heavily influenced by the xenomorphs depicted in the Alien franchise, which was very different from their original conception in an entry of the "Aliens and monsters" section of the first edition of Warhammer 40,000 (the "WH40K - Rogue Trader" manual). Since the 1990s, subsequent games like Warhammer 40,000 and Epic have absorbed Genestealer as part of the overall Tyranid army where they serve as the shock troops, although their origins are not related to any other Tyranid broods. A force composed purely of Genestealers can still be fielded as a sub-type of the Tyranid army, in what is known as a Genestealer Cult. The Cult is described in the in-game background as an infiltration force that weakens a target planet, infecting the local population and causing civil unrest in advance of the arrival of the main Tyranid hive fleet.

The first recognisable incarnation of Tyranid warriors appeared in Advanced Space Crusade in 1990, featuring biological weaponry such as boneswords and deathspitters.

Second Edition Warhammer 40,000, released in 1993, featured the Tyranids in the supplemental books Wargear and Codex Imperialis, and then later in their own devoted army Codex. An extensive model range was released, representing most of the units described in these publications. The army was, however, very different from the factions previously seen in the game.

The Tyranid player now had access to a range of unit types roughly equivalent to that of the other factions, including the Hive Tyrant, Termagants, Hormagaunts, the main adversary in Space Hulk Genestealers, Gargoyles previously seen in Epic 40,000, Tyranid Warriors, the Carnifex which is as powerful as other races' dreadnoughts, Zoanthropes (a Tyranid psyker in addition to the Hive Tyrant), Lictors for infiltration, and the Biovore for artillery.

In the Tyranid supplement to Third Edition Warhammer 40,000 there was an emphasis on revamping the rules for the various units while maintaining the overall structure of the army, so that veteran players would not find their older collections unusable or less useful in the new edition. The supplement did however add some new units and adjust the behaviour of others. A brand-new model range, somewhat different from the older one, was released to coincide with the new publication. New units included: the Tyrant Guard and Raveners.

The Third Edition Codex, as with a number of subsequent publications, included an army list which permitted far greater flexibility to the player than previous army lists, allowing extensive customisation of units. Unit types noted as a 'Mutable Genus' in the main army list were permitted to be extensively modified by choosing from numerous options in the 'Custom Hive Fleet' section of the book. The options available bore a resemblance to the random equipment tables featured in Rogue Trader, but were no longer randomised.

The nature of the army list in Third Edition further cemented the Tyranid army's reputation for fielding vast numbers of models, allowing the player to overwhelm an opponent with weight of numbers. This was even more pronounced in the variant Seeding Swarm army list published in White Dwarf and later in Chapter Approved, which represented the initial stages of a massive Tyranid assault and even further emphasised the use of many expendable, 'cannon-fodder' type units.

The release of the fourth edition codex added a new model range, new rules, and new units, most notably the Broodlord, a larger alpha genestealer, and revamped units such as the Carnifex. This new codex also enables Tyranid players to field a total of eight large Tyranids to be deployed in a medium-sized battle, although the player would still have to field compulsory troop choices. With this concept Tyranid armies can now consist of many troops and/or a just few powerful units. One of the more overlooked abilities was the new "without number" rule, which allowed for an unlimited number of gaunts in a single game, emphasising the "cannon-fodder" trait of the Tyranids.

A new Tyranid codex was released on 16 January 2010, written by Robin Cruddance. It included 15 new species of Tyranid, and legendary heroes like the Swarmlord, Old One Eye and the Doom of Malan'tai. In addition, some models saw a point cost reduction, which allowed certain Tyranid armies to field more units, although this was not the case for all Tyranid units. The Carnifex, a mainstay of previous editions, saw its point cost almost double, with many of its options removed and with no corresponding increase in effectiveness.

The Tyranids received new rules for the eighth edition of Warhammer 40,000 in Index: Xenos 2, released in June 2017. An updated version of these rules will be released on 11 November 2017 in the new Codex: Tyranids.

Fictional in-game history

The first recorded contact between the Imperium and the Tyranids was in 745.M41 (745th year of the 41st millennium) on the Eastern Fringes of the Milky Way galaxy. There are rumours that the Ordo Xenos of the Inquisition had identified possible appearances of the Tyranids as far back as the 35th Millennium.

The Tyranids emerged from the intergalactic space of the Local Group of galaxies, their Hive Mind drawn to the Milky Way like moths to a candle across the intergalactic void by the Pharos device. First encountered by humanity when the Loyalist Iron Warriors Warsmith Barabas Dantioch arrived on the world of Sotha during the Horus Heresy and found it had been constructed within the geographical landmark of Mount Pharos, which gave the device its name. The first officially recorded contact with the Tyranids for the Imperium of Man came during an attack on the Forge World of Tyran by hive fleet Behemoth, and from there the fleet continued through the Ultramar sector of imperial space, consuming all the worlds in its path. The Tyranids were defeated, by the efforts of the Ultramarines Chapter of Space Marines and suffered devastating losses during the Battle of Macragge 

In 942.M41, Commissar Ciaphas Cain, on a mission in the Ice World called Nusquam , discovered hibernating Tyranids buried deep in the permafrost; the swarm was apparently carried to the planet by a Hive Ship that had crashed on the planet, prior to any human colonization. The Inquisition was unsettled by the fact that the Tyranids possibly developed a presence in the galaxy before the start of the Imperium; it is unknown whether the crashed bio-ship was on a scouting mission when it was lost, was a casualty in a pre-Imperium Tyranid invasion force that was defeated by unknown adversaries, or part of a plan by a Tyranid intelligence that may have "seeded" the galaxy with many slumbering broods.

In 993.M41, the Tyranids returned to the Milky Way with Hive Fleet Kraken, changing tactics from assaulting targets as a single massed Hive Fleet to instead splitting into smaller fleets, each enveloping star systems before reinforcements can arrive. The brunt of this new attack was borne by the Space Marine Chapters known as the Scythes of the Emperor and the Lamenters. Eventually the backbone of the Hive Fleet was broken by its defeats at the Battle of Ichar IV and at the Aeldari Craftworld Iyanden. The cost to the Imperium was still great, Craftworld Iyanden lost more than half of its population, and many splinter fleets broke off from Kraken to later wreak havoc deep within Imperial space.

In 997.M41, Hive Fleet Leviathan appeared from "below" the plane of the galaxy (on the Z axis) and attacked from two points, cutting off large portions of the galaxy from reinforcements. It threatened the defences of the Segmentum Solar and Terra, the capital of the Imperium of Man, but the Tyranids were distracted by being deflected into the star system of a powerful Ork empire. As of the "current events" of the setting, the Orks manage to stem -but not halt- the main Tyranid Hive Fleet's advance, and may have begun to strengthen themselves on Ork DNA as more powerful versions are appearing from this sector of space.

The Battle for Macragge 

The Tyranids were a major race in the fourth edition of Warhammer 40k, especially due to their presence in the Battle for Macragge boxed game, released in 2004. The set included six Genestealers, ten Termagants, and eight Spore Mines. The box set represented the Battle for Macragge, one of the most detailed battles for both the Tyranids and the Ultramarines Chapter of Space Marines.

Famed for their close combat attacks, Tyranids were chosen  to be the aliens who set about destroying the Ultramarines homeworld of Macragge. In the preceding months Hive Fleet Behemoth had been scouring the Ultramar sector leaving dead and barren planets in their wake, so when it arrived at Macragge the Tyranids found a planet ready for battle. As well as Macragge's Starnova defence stations, the planet's defences were bolstered by other fleets. When the Behemoth arrived at Macragge it fought with all its might in space and on land to subdue and consume the Ultramarines. This led to a fateful stand on Cold Steel Ridge, where the Hive Mind dispatched the Swarmlord, an ancient Hive Tyrant. As soon as it stepped onto the battlefield, the swarm's ferocity was paired with keen strategy. It mutilated the chapter master and left him lying on the ground. In the end, only detonating the warp engines of the battleship Dominus Astra in the heart of the Tyranid fleet succeeded in destroying the central Tyranid hive ship, throwing the swarm into disarray and putting an end to the invasion. Even though the Tyranids failed in their attempt, they thoroughly devastated the planet and managed to wipe out all one hundred members of the Ultramarines' elite 1st Company, a feat never before accomplished, and never repeated since, by any other enemy of the Imperium.

In alternative games 

The Tyranids are represented in three of the Specialist Games produced by Games Workshop: Battlefleet: Gothic, Epic, and Inquisitor.

In Battlefleet: Gothic, a game focusing on spaceship to spaceship fleet combat, they are represented by four models that represent the massive biologically constructed ships of the Tyranid Hivefleet. In Epic, the game of large scale combat using smaller miniatures, they are represented by a combination of Titans and standard Tyranid troops. In Inquisitor, the narrative skirmish game using Warhammer 40,000 type characters, the Tyranids are represented by the Genestealer and Hybrid models under the generic roleplaying category of "aliens." They are individual members of the Genestealer Cults who work towards espionage and propagating their species in secret to weaken a planet's defenses before an invasion, as opposed to being part of the Hivefleet army that seeks to swarm over all in their path and consume them.

In video games 

 Space Hulk (1993) - the squad of terminator armor-clad Space Marines fight against genestealers in a derelict spaceship.
 Space Hulk: Vengeance of the Blood Angels (1995)
 Warhammer 40,000: Rites of War (1999) features the Tyranids as a playable faction alongside two others; the Aeldari and the Imperium. In the game's plot the Tyranids attack an Aeldari world.
 Warhammer 40,000: Dawn of War II (2009) includes the Tyranids as a playable race along with the Imperial Guard, Chaos Space Marines, Aeldari, Orks, and Space Marines. The playable "heroes" (commander units) include the Hive Tyrant, Ravener Alpha and Lictor Alpha, and the forces of a Tyranid splinter fleet act as the primary antagonists in the single player campaign; the campaign is only playable from the point of view of the Blood Raven chapter of Space Marines. The Tyranids are also the background antagonists in Dawn of War II - Chaos Rising (2010), with multiplayer command units staying the same as in the Dawn of War II. However, in the expansion Dawn of War II - Retribution (2011), they are a playable race in the single-player campaign. Notably, the Tyranids are one of the few Warhammer 40,000 factions that were not in the first game of the Dawn of War series, Warhammer 40000: Dawn of War. The fact that Tyranids were not present is likely due to their nature; as Tyranids do not create structures or technology in the same way as the other races (not to mention the lack of usable wargear because of this), it would be difficult to have them perform as the other races do in the game. Relic has also repeatedly stated  that they wanted to include the Tyranids in Dawn Of War, but the game's graphic engine "wouldn't do them justice". Other issues cited included significant differences in economy. The altered overall game mechanics of the aforementioned sequel, together with improved graphical capabilities of later computers apparently allowed them to depict Tyranids in a manner the developers found acceptable.
 Space Hulk (2013 video game) (2013)
 Warhammer 40,000: Eternal Crusade (2016) features the Tyranids as a non-playable faction controlled by the AI as a PvE part of the game.
 Space Hulk: Deathwing (2016) features genestealers as the primary antagonists of the main character's squad, several Space Marine terminators of the elite Deathwing unit within the Dark Angels chapter. 
 Warhammer 40,000: Gladius – Relics of War (2018) includes the Tyranids as a playable faction alongside Chaos Space Marines, Imperial Guard, Necrons, Orks, Space Marines, and the T'au Empire.
 Battlefleet Gothic: Armada 2 (2019) introduces the Tyranid spaceborne creatures as a playable faction with their own singleplayer campaign. The Tyranids, due to their biological nature, don't have the traditional means of propulsion and instead they move through space very slowly through unknown means, with a special ability of a sudden high-speed jump that allows the Tyranid vessels to ram other ships.
 Warhammer 40,000: Battlesector (2021) Turn-based mass wargame which includes the Tyranids as a playable faction alongside the Blood Angels chapter of Space Marines, and eventually Necrons with the downloadable content pack.
 The upcoming Warhammer 40,000: Space Marine II will feature the Tyranids as antagonists.

References & notes 

 
 
 

Bioships
Fictional collective consciousnesses
Fictional superorganisms
Fictional warrior races
Warhammer 40,000 species